Cathérine Pellen (born 4 December 1956 in Paris) is a French athlete who competes in compound archery. She represented France at the 1988 Summer Olympics, reaching the quarter final, before converting to the compound discipline. As a compound archer she became the 1999 World Champion, and also became World Champion in the indoor and field competitions.

References

External links
 
 
 
 

1956 births
Living people
French female archers
Olympic archers of France
Archers at the 1988 Summer Olympics
World Archery Championships medalists
Sportspeople from Paris
20th-century French women
21st-century French women